The January 2001 El Salvador earthquake struck El Salvador on January 13, 2001, at 17:33:34 UTC. The 7.6 (later estimated to be 7.7 or 7.9) quake struck with the epicenter 60 miles (100 km) SW of San Miguel, El Salvador (13.04°N 88.66°W) at a depth of 60 km.

Impact

At least 944 people were killed, 5,565 others were injured, 108,261 houses collapsed, with another 169,692 houses damaged, and more than 150,000 buildings were damaged in El Salvador. About 585 of the deaths were caused by large landslides in Santa Tecla  and Comasagua. As is often the case after earthquakes in El Salvador, landslides wreaked significant damage. Estimation of the number of slides is difficult because individual scarps conjoin. The total has been reported as high as 16,000, though it is unclear how this figure was arrived at. Damage and injuries occurred in every department of El Salvador, particularly the departments of La Libertad and Usulután. Eight people were killed in Guatemala. The tremor was felt from Mexico City to Colombia. An aftershock measuring 5.7 magnitude was felt on January 15, an event not widely reported outside the country until after another earthquake on February 13, which initially was assessed by the USGS at 5.7 magnitude as well.

As of February 2, 2001, more than 2,500 aftershocks had hit El Salvador, leading to additional damage and terrorizing the inhabitants. Clean water and sanitation became a matter of grave concern in many areas due to the earthquake's destruction of some $7 million to municipal drinking water systems, and tens of thousands of people were living outdoors in spite of the approaching rainy season (Invierno). Government and public health organizations warned of the possible spread of disease as desperate people began to scavenge debris piles – some containing severed human limbs – looking for items they could pawn to purchase needed food and other commodities.

Tectonic setting
El Salvador lies above the convergent boundary where oceanic crust of the Cocos Plate is being subducted beneath the Caribbean Plate at rate of about 72 mm per year along the Middle America Trench. This boundary is associated with earthquakes resulting from movement on the plate interface itself, such as the  7.7 1992 Nicaragua earthquake, and from faulting within both the overriding Caribbean Plate and the subducting Cocos Plate, such as the 1982 El Salvador earthquake.

Earthquake 
The January 13 earthquake was a result of normal faulting within the subducting Cocos Plate as shown by the hypocentral depth and published focal mechanisms. Of the two possible fault planes indicated, analysis of observed seismic waves supports the solution with a fault plane dipping moderately to the northeast. It was followed by a series of aftershocks, including 70 greater than M 4 of which 10 were greater than M 5 in the period up to February 2, 2020. The largest aftershock was an M 5.8 event at 12:20 on January 15.

Exactly one month after the mainshock there was another destructive earthquake, which occurred on an entirely different fault within the overriding Caribbean Plate, leading to a further 315 deaths.

Post-quake analysis 
In the days and weeks following the earthquakes, Salvadoran and foreign agencies analysed the factors that had facilitated the destruction the disasters had caused. While Salvadoran government representatives were quick to point out that the destruction had been far less than that of the 1986 earthquakes, outside researchers critiqued shortcomings in preparedness and in policies toward land development that had permitted massive deforestation in the Santa Tecla area. Mexican seismologists invited by the Salvadoran government summarized their observations this way:

The government's response to the earthquakes was critiqued from different sides, with some criticizing the legislature for not approving the full amount of emergency funding urged by President Flores, and others condemning what they saw as the ARENA government's contributions to the devastation. The Nicaragua-based magazine Envío argued that the conservative government's pro-business stance had fostered aggressive levels of land development, coupled with high poverty rates that forced poor rural residents to make do with inadequate but cheap building materials, asserting: "Totaling up these factors makes it clear that the consequences of a natural phenomenon like an earthquake cannot be described as 'natural' ... Describing the January 13 earthquake as a 'natural disaster' is not only irresponsible, but also a declaration of future impotence. It assumes fatalistic acceptance that no natural phenomena can be prevented and that all one can do is respond to emergencies as they arise and try to rehabilitate and reconstruct what has been destroyed." The magazine further critiqued the government's optimism about economic recovery in the aftermath of the first quake as an "insulting" minimization of the tragedy caused across the country and as an attempt to shore up the dollarization campaign that had been the focus of political attention up until the quakes.

See also
 1986 San Salvador earthquake
 List of earthquakes in 2001
 List of earthquakes in El Salvador

References

External links 
First quake (USGS)
Second quake (USGS)
Images – International Services – El Salvador Earthquake, 2001, photos and information by the American Red Cross

El Salvador 2001, 01
2001, 01
2001, 01
Earthquake 01
Earthquake 01
El Salvador earthquake
El Salvador 2001.01
El Salvador 01